Skiatook (Skī·ǎ·tōōk or Skī·ǎ·tǒǒk versus Skī·tōōk or Skī·tǒǒk) is a city in Osage and Tulsa counties in the U.S. state of Oklahoma  located in the northeastern part of the state, approximately 20 miles north and west of Tulsa. Due to its location on the border between Osage County and Tulsa County, Skiatook has been referred to as "the Gateway to the Osage." The town includes the state highway junction of Oklahoma State Highway 11 and Oklahoma State Highway 20.
The population was 8,450 at the 2020 census, an increase of 14.24 percent over the figure of 7,397 recorded in 2010.

History

19th century

Battle of Chustenahlah

The Battle of Chustenahlah was fought just west of Skiatook, on December 26, 1861, during the American Civil War. The battle began when Confederate Col. James McIntosh ordered an attack on the Union aligned Creek Chief Opothleyahola's forces. Opothleyahola was travelling with about 1,700 Creek and Seminole refugees following his defeat at the Battle of Chusto-Talasah. After being defeated by the Confederate forces, many refugees were forced to abandoned their supplies as they fled to Kansas. 
A historical marker commemorates the battle.

Founding and origin of name 

William C. Rogers, last hereditary Chief of the Cherokees, founded Skiatook in 1872, when he established a trading post in the Cherokee Nation on the south bank of Bird Creek. When a post office was established in Rogers' store in 1872, the place was named Ski-a-took. The word is Cherokee in origin, and means "Big-Indian-Me" or refers to something of large size. An Osage trader, Skiatooka is also cited as influencing the town's name. In 1892, the name was changed from Ski-a-took to Skiatook.

20th century

On December 18, 1904, a bank was established on the present day location of Skiatook. William C. Rogers relocated his general store and post office to the town and began building near the bank. In March 1905 the Midland Valley Railroad was built through the town and the settlement expanded to include parts of Osage County and the Osage Nation. The route no longer exists, but has been converted from rail into the 14.5 mile Osage Prairie Trail linking Skiatook with Tulsa to the south. Skiatook's first newspaper, the Skiatook Sentinel, began publication in April 1905 and the town was incorporated shortly after on May 28, 1905. Skiatook's first school was also founded in 1905.

After Oklahoma Statehood in 1907, construction began on permanent roads and bridges.
The first church building constructed in Skiatook was the First Christian Church in 1907.
Cement sidewalks were constructed between 1909 and 1910, and in 1912 Skiatook received water, sewer and electric light improvements.
By 1920, the towns population had increased to around 2000.
A road to Tulsa was paved in the early 1920s, and with good roads leading out in all directions, Skiatook became known as the "Gateway to all points North, South, East and West".
In the 1930s, Skiatook began purchasing water from Lake Spavinaw.
The completion of Skiatook Lake in 1984 gave Skiatook its own water source.

21st century
In the 2000's Skiatook commissioned a "Main Street program" in order to revitalize its downtown area.

Geography
Skiatook is located in the northeastern part of the state, approximately 20 miles north and west of Tulsa. Due to its location on the border between Osage County and Tulsa County, Skiatook has been referred to as "the Gateway to the Osage." The town includes the state highway junction of Oklahoma State Highway 11 and Oklahoma State Highway 20.

Skiatook Lake

Skiatook Dam and Lake was authorized for construction by the Flood Control Act approved October 23, 1962 (87th Congress). It is one of five projects in the Bird Creek Basin plan recommended to meet the comprehensive water resources needs of the area. The project serves the purposes of flood control, water quality, water supply, recreation, and fish and wildlife management. The total cost of the project was approximately $120 million. It was completed in 1984.

Demographics

As of the 2010 census, there were 7,397 people, 2,796 households, and 1,989 families residing in the town. There were 2,125 housing units at an average density of 145.3 per square mile (56.1/km2). The racial makeup of the town was 73.3% White, 0.6% African American, 17.7% Native American, 0.6% Asian, 0.01% Pacific Islander, 0.6% from other races, and 8.86% from two or more races. Hispanic or Latino of any race were 2.9% of the population.

There were 2,796 households, out of which 36.1% had children under the age of 18 living with them, 49.6% were married couples living together, 15.0% had a female householder with no husband present, and 28.9% were non-families. 24.0% of all households were made up of individuals, and 10% had someone living alone who was 65 years of age or older. The average household size was 2.63 and the average family size was 3.11.

In the town, the population was spread out, with 31.0% under the age of 18, 9.3% from 18 to 24, 28.1% from 25 to 44, 18.2% from 45 to 64, and 13.3% who were 65 years of age or older. The median age was 32 years. For every 100 females, there were 85.9 males. For every 100 females age 18 and over, there were 81.9 males.

The median income for a household in the town was $39,617, and the median income for a family was $52,072. Males had a median income of $30,873 versus $21,419 for females. The per capita income for the town was $19,943. About 9.4% of families and 12.9% of the population were below the poverty line, including 17.7% of those under age 18 and 11.6% of those age 65 or over.

Government

Skiatook has a city government with a 7-member city council and a City Manager. City public services include a full-time fire department, which also provides emergency medical service for Skiatook and the surrounding rural area (approx. ); a full-time police department with 24-hour E911 communications center; and refuse service, sanitation and sewage. The city is responsible for a comprehensive city plan and for zoning.

In May, 2019, the city council voted unanimously for Roger Upton to serve as Mayor for the next two years. Herb Forbes will serve as Vice Mayor during the same period.

Parks and recreation

In 2010 Skiatook opened a $2.3 million park that features splash pads, new playground equipment and even a pond and walking trails.

Osage Trail walking trail is 14.5 miles long, starting in Skiatook.
Skiatook residents enjoy multiple recreational opportunities, including Osage Park, John Zink Park, Smith Park, the Skiatook Sports Park, soccer fields, tennis courts, a nine-hole golf course, a driving range, shooting range, and Skiatook Lake. There are numerous little leagues (football, baseball, softball, soccer) and an adult soccer league.

The Osage Prairie Trail was constructed with Vision 2025 funds, and this  jogging and bike trail connects Skiatook to Tulsa's extensive bike and jogging trail system. The Skiatook community pool was opened in the 1950s, and provided swimming lessons to thousands of Skiatook children. Due to deteriorating conditions, the old pool was closed in 2001. The new pool opened to the public on June 2, 2007.

Public Schools

Skiatook is served by the Skiatook Public Schools district.

The first Skiatook Public Schools School Board was elected in 1907 after statehood. The district originally operated out of one building on the corner of 2nd and B streets. In 1908, a bond paid for a new school in the block between 3rd and 4th streets and Osage and B streets. An addition was added to this building in 1913 and an annex was built in 1920 on 3rd and Osage. In 1922, the town approved a new high school and junior high to be built. In 1929, the original school building burned down, leading to the building of a new elementary school in 1930. In the 1960's a new junior high school was built and in 1968 Mars Elementary was built. In 1976, the current high school was built with a sports complex added in 1978, an auditorium added in 1979. A football stadium, baseball field, soccer field, and agriculture building were also built around the high school. In 1990, Newman Middle School was built and named after former Superintendent Jim Newman.

Currently operating Skiatook Public Schools include: 
Joyce Jech Early Childhood Center
Mars Elementary
Skiatook Elementary
Skiatook Intermediate Elementary
Newman Middle School
Skiatook High School
Skiatook Virtual Academy (virtual school for 6th-12th grades)

Arts and culture

The Skiatook Museum was organized in April 1976. In the early 21st century, the Skiatook Museum moved into the former home of doctor W. G. Phillips. The home, built in 1912, contained his office.

Media

Skiatook in film
Parts of the 1983 film adaptation of S.E. Hinton's novel The Outsiders were filmed in locations around Skiatook
Parts of the 2020 film Minari were filmed in and around Skiatook.

References

1872 establishments in Indian Territory
Cherokee towns in Oklahoma
Cities in Osage County, Oklahoma
Cities in Tulsa County, Oklahoma
Cities in Oklahoma
Populated places established in 1872
Skiatook, Oklahoma
Tulsa metropolitan area